Odontarthria is a genus of snout moths described by Émile Louis Ragonot in 1893.

Species
 Odontarthria ochrivenella Ragonot, 1893
 Odontarthria tropica Roesler, 1983

References

Phycitinae
Taxa named by Émile Louis Ragonot
Pyralidae genera